Kacper Radkowski (born 27 March 2001) is a Polish professional footballer who plays as a centre-back for Irish club Bohemians, on loan from Śląsk Wrocław.

Career statistics

Club

Notes

References

2001 births
Living people
Polish footballers
Poland youth international footballers
Association football defenders
Ekstraklasa players
I liga players
II liga players
League of Ireland players
Legia Warsaw players
Zagłębie Sosnowiec players
Śląsk Wrocław players
Bohemian F.C. players
Polish expatriate footballers
Polish expatriate sportspeople in Ireland
Expatriate association footballers in the Republic of Ireland